This is a list of abbots of Monte Cassino.

Italian names are given in italics in parentheses for abbots before the third destruction of the abbey.

6th century 
 Benedict of Nursia (Benedetta da Norcia) : from 525/529
 Constantine (Costantino) : 547 – 560?
 Simplicius (Simplicio) : 560? – 576?
 Vitalis (Vitale) : 576? – 580?
 Bonitus (Bonito) : 580? – 584

8th century 
 Petronax (Petronace) : 717? – 747
 Optatus (Optato)  : 747?	– 760
 Ermeris (Ermeri)  : 760 – 760
 Gratian (Graziano) : 760 – 764
 Tomichis (Tomichi) : 764 – 771
 Poto (Potone) : 771 – 777
 Theodemar (Teodemaro) : 777/778 – 796
 Gisulf (Gisolfo or Gisulfo) : 796 – 817

9th century 
 Apollinaris (Apollinare) : 817 – 828
 Deusdedit (Diodato) : 828 – 834
 Hilderic (Ilderico) : 834 – 834
 Autpert (Autperto) : 834 – 837
 Bassacius (Bassacio) : 837 – 856
 Bertharius (Bertario) : 856 – 883

In 883, the abbey was destroyed by the Aghlabids and the monks moved to Teano and later Capua.

 Angelar I (Angelario) : 883 – 889
 Ragembrand (Ragembrando) : 890 – 899
 Leo (Leone or Leo) : 899 – 914

10th century 
 John I (Giovanni) : 914 – 934
 Adelpert (Adelperto) : 934 – 943/944?
 Baldwin (Baldovino) : 943/944? – 946
 Maielpot (Maielpoto) : 943/944? – 948

With Aligern, the monks return to Monte Cassino.

 Aligern (Aligerno) : 948 – 985
 Manso (Mansone) : 986 – 996
 John II (Giovanni) : 996 – 997
 John III (Giovanni) : 997 – 1010

11th century 
 John IV (Giovanni IV) : 1010 – 1011
 Atenulf (Atenolfo) : 1011 – 1022
 Theobald (Teobaldo) : 1022 – 1035
 Basil (Basilio) : 1036 – 1038
 Richer I (Richerio) : 1038 – 1055
 Peter I (Pietro) : 1055 – 1057
 Frederick (Federico) : 1057 – 1058
 Desiderius or Daufer (Desiderio or Dauferio) : 1058 – 1087
 Oderisius I (Oderisio) : 1087 – 1105

12th century 
 Otto (Ottone) : 1105 – 1107
 Bruno (Bruno) : 1107 – 1111
 Gerard (Gerardo) : 1111 – 1123
 Oderisius II (Oderisio) : 1123 – 1126
 Nicholas I (Nicola) : 1126 – 1127
 Seniorectus (Senioretto) : 1127 – 1137
 Rainald I (Rainaldo) : 1137
 Wibald (Guibaldo or Wibaldo) : 1137
 Rainald II (Rainaldo II) : 1137 – 1166
 Theodin I (Teodino) : 1166 – 1167
 Giles or Aegidius (Egidio) : 1168
 Peter (Pietro) : 1168 – 1171 (apostolic administrator)
 Dominic (Domenico) : 1171 – 1174
 Peter II (Pietro II) : 1174 – 1186
 Roffred (Roffredo dell'Isola) : 1188 – 1210

13th century 
 Peter III (Pietro III) : 1210 – 1211
 Adenulf of Caserta (Adenolfo) : 1211 – 1215
 Stephen I (Stefano) : 1215 – 1227
 Landulf Sinibald (Landolfo Sinibaldo) : 1227 – 1236
 Pandulf (Pandolfo) : 1237 – 1238 (apostolic administrator)
 Stephen II (Stefano) : 1238 – 1248
 Nicholas II (Nicola) : 1251 - ?
 Richard (Riccardo) : 1252 – 1262
 Theodin II (Teodino II) : 1262 – 1263
 Bernard Ayglerius (Bernardo Aiglerio) : 1263 – 1282
 Thomas I (Tommaso) : 1285 – 1288
 Ponce (Ponzio) : 1292 – 1292
 William (Guglielmo) :  1293 – 1294?
 Angelar II (Angelario II) : 1294 – 1295
 Berard (Beraudo) : 1295 – 1295
 Bernard (Bernardo) : 1295 – 1296 (apostolic administrator)
 Galard (Galardo) : 1296 – 1301

14th century 
 Thomas II (Tommaso II) : 1304 – ?
 Marinus (Marino) : 1306 – 1313
 Isnard de Pontevès (Isnardo) : ? – ?
 Odo or Eudes (Oddone) : 1323 – 1326 (apostolic administrator)

From Raymond on, the abbots are bishops.

 Raymond de Gramat (Raimondo) : 1326 – 1340
 Guy of San Germano (Guido di San Germano) : 1340 – 1341
 Richer II de Miremont (Richerio) : 1341 – 1343
 Stephen III Aldebrand (Stefano) : 1343 – 1345/1346
 William II de Rosières (Guglielmo) : 1345–1346 – 1353

In 1349, the abbey was destroyed by an earthquake.

 Francesco degli Atti : 1353 – 1355
 Angelo I Acciaiuoli : 1355 – 1357
 Angelo II della Posta : 1357 – 1362
 Angelo III Orsini : 1362 – 1365
 Guglielmo III : 1366 – 1369

From Bartolomeo on, the abbots are once again monks (not bishops).

 Bartolomeo da Siena : 1369 – 1369
 Andrea I da Faenza : 1369 – 1373
 Pietro IV de Tartaris : 1374 – 1395
 Enrico Tomacelli : 1396 – 1413

15th century 
 Pirro Tomacelli : 1414 – 1442
 Antonio Carafa : 1446 – 1454

From Ludovico on, the abbots are in commendam.

 Ludovico Trevisan : 1454 – 1465
 Pietro V Barbo : 1465 – 1471
 Giovanni d'Aragona : 1471 – 1485
 Giovanni de' Medici : 1486 – 1504

16th century 
From Zaccaria on, the abbots are heads of the Cassinese congregation.

 Zaccaria Castagnola : 1506 – 1509
 Graziano II : 1509 – 1510
 Ignazio Squarcialupi : 1510 – 1516
 Vincenzo de Riso : 1517 – 1518
 Teofilo Piacentini : 1519 – 1520
 Ignazio Squarcialupi : 1520 – 1521 (second time)
 Ludovico Trivulzio : 1522 – 1522
 Giustino Harbes : 1522 – 1523
 Ignazio Squarcialupi : 1524 – 1526 (third time)
 Crisostomo de Alessandro : 1527 – 1531
 Agostino Bonfili : 1531 – 1533
 Crisostomo de Alessandro : 1533 – 1538 (second time)
 Girolamo : 1538 – 1539
 Ignazio II : 1539 – 1541
 Girolamo II Scloccheto : 1541 – 1546
 Lorenzo Zambelli : 1546 – 1549
 Girolamo II Scloccheto : 1549 – 1551 (second time)
 Innocenzo Nicolai : 1551 – 1554
 Girolamo III Calcini : 1554 – 1555
 Isidoro Mantegazzi : 1555 – 1556
 Ignazio III Vicani : 1556 – 1559
 Angelo IV de Faggis : 1559 – 1564
 Ignazio III Vicani : 1564 – 1565 (second time)
 Angelo IV de Faggis : 1565 – 1568 (second time)
 Bernardo II de Adamo : 1568 – 1570
 Mattia Mattaleia : 1570 – 1572
 Angelo IV de Faggis : 1572 – 1575 (third time)
 Girolamo IV Gersale : 1575 – 1577
 Bernardo III Ferrajolo : 1577 – 1580
 Desiderio II : 1580 – 1585
 Bernardo III Ferrajolo : 1585 – 1587 (second time)
 Egidio II Sernicoli : 1587 – 1589
 Andrea II : 1589 – 1590
 Girolamo V Brugia : 1590 – 1595
 Basilio II : 1595 – 1596
 Vittorino de Manso : 1597 – 1598
 Zaccaria II Tarasco : 1598 – 1599
 Ambrogio Rastellini : 1599 – 1602

17th century 
 Desiderio III : 1603 – 1604
 Gregorio Casamata : 1605 – 1608
 Paolo da Cosenza : 1608 – 1609
 Onorato Scalisi : 1609 – 1614
 Isidoro II Agresti : 1614 – 1617
 Paolo II Scotti : 1617 – 1621
 Bernardino Saivedra : 1621 – 1624
 Simplicio II Caffarelli : 1625 – 1628
 Paolo II Scotti : 1629 – 1630 (second time)
 Angelo V Grassi : 1631 – 1631
 Paolo Camillo Casati : 1632 – 1634
 Desiderio IV Petronio : 1635 – 1639
 Severino Fusco : 1640 – 1645
 Andrea III Arcioni : 1645 - 1647
 Desiderio IV Petronio : 1648 – 1649
 Domenico II Quesada : 1650 – 1653
 Carlo de Mauro : 1654 – 1657
 Angelo VI della Noce : 1657 – 1661
 Anastasio Perrone : 1661 – 1665
 Angelo VI della Noce : 1665 – 1669 (second time)
 Mauro Cesarini : 1669 – 1675
 Severino II Pepe : 1675 – 1680
 Andrea IV Deodati : 1680 – 1681
 Sebastiano Biancardi : 1681 – 1687
 Andrea IV Deodati : 1687 – 1692 (second time)
 Severino II Pepe : 1692 – 1697 (second time)
 Ippolito della Penna : 1697 – 1704

18th century 
 Gregorio II Galisio : 1704 – 1717
 Nicola III Ruggi : 1717 – 1722
 Arcangelo Brancaccio : ? – 1725
 Sebastiano II Gadaleta : 1725 – 1731
 Stefano IV de Stefano : 1731 – 1737
 Ildefonso del Verme : 1737 – 1739
 Sebastiano II Gadaleta : 1739 – 1745 (second time)
 Antonio II Capece : 1745 – 1751
 Giovanni Maria Ragosa : 1751 – 1753
 Marino II Migliarese : 1754 – 1760
 Domenico III Favilla : 1760 – 1766
 Aurelio Parisio : 1766 – 1772
 Rinaldo Santomagno : 1772 – 1778
 Domenico III Favilla : 1778 – 1780 (second time)
 Prospero de Rosa : 1781 – 1787
 Tommaso II Capomazza : 1788 – 1793
 Prospero de Rosa : 1793 – 1797 (second time)
 Marino III Lucarelli : 1797 – 1804

19th century 
 Aurelio II Visconti : 1804 – 1816
 Giuseppe del Balzo : 1817 – 1821
 Luigi Bovio : 1821 – 1828
 Giacomo Diez : 1828 – 1834
 Celestino Gonzaga : 1834 – 1840
 Matteo Morso : 1840 – 1840
 Giuseppe II Frisari : 1841 – 1849
 Michelangelo Celesia : 1850 – 1858
 Simplicio III Pappalettere : 1858 – 1863
 Carlo II de Vera : 1863 – 1871
 Nicola IV d'Orgemont : 1872 – 1896
 Giuseppe III Quandel : 1896 – 1897
 Bonifacio Maria Krug : 1897 – 1909

20th century 
 Gregorio IV Diamare : 1909 – 1945

In 1944, the abbey was destroyed a fourth time during the battle of Monte Cassino.

 Ildefonso II Rea : 1945 – 1971
 Martino Matronola : 1971 – 1983
 Bernardo IV Fabio D'Onorio : 1983 – 2007

21st century 
 Pietro VI Vittorelli : 2007 – 2013
 Donato Ogliari : 2014 –

References

External links
Gli Abati de Montecassino

 
Monte Cassino